Audley is a surname of Old English origin derived from the village of Audley, Staffordshire. Notable people with the surname include:

 Anselm Audley (born 1982), British fantasy writer
 Eleanor Audley (1905–1991), American actress
 Henry de Audley (1175–1246), English baron
 Hugh Audley (1577–1662), English moneylender and lawyer in the 17th century
 Hugh de Audley, 1st Earl of Gloucester (1291–1347), English lord
 James Audley (disambiguation), several people
 John Audley (disambiguation), several people
 Margaret Audley (disambiguation), several people
 Margaret de Audley, 2nd Baroness Audley (1318–c.1350), English noblewoman
 Maxine Audley (1923–1992), English actress
 Michael Audley (1913–1995), American film director
 Thomas Audley, 1st Baron Audley of Walden (1488–1544), Lord Chancellor under Henry VIII
 Tom Audley (born 1986), English rugby player

Fictional characters:
 Charles Audley, protagonist of the Georgette Heyer historical romance novel about the Battle of Waterloo, An Infamous Army
 David Audley, protagonist in the series of eponymous British espionage thrillers by Anthony Price
 Julian Audley, Earl of Worth, protagonist of the Georgette Heyer historical romance novel, Regency Buck
 Lucy Audley, protagonist of the Mary Elizabeth Braddon's sensational novel Lady Audley's Secret

See also
 Baron Audley, a title in the English peerage
 Audley Harrison, British professional boxer.

References